Flag of Georgia may refer to:

Flag of Georgia (country)
 Flag of the Georgian Soviet Socialist Republic
Flag of Georgia (U.S. state)